Clube Desportivo Primeiro de Agosto is a multisports club from Luanda, Angola. The club's volleyball teams (men and women) compete at the local level, at the Luanda Provincial Volleyball Championship and at the Angola Volleyball League as well as at continental level, at the annual African Volleyball Champions League competitions.

Primeiro de Agosto Men's Volleyball

Honours: Men's Volleyball

League :
Winner (11): 2004, 2005, 2006, 2007, 2008, 2009, 2010, 2011, 2012, 2013, 2014
 Runner Up (1) : 2003

Angola Cup:
Winner (0): 
 Runner Up (0) :

CAVB Club Champions Cup:
Winner (0): 
 Runner Up (0) :

2015 squad (Men)

Former Managers

Primeiro de Agosto Women's Volleyball

Honours: Women's Volleyball

National League:
Winner (21): 1992, 1993, 1994, 1995, 1996, 1997, 1998, 1999, 2000, 2001, 2002, 2003, 2004, 2005, 2006, 2007, 2008, 2009, 2010, 2013, 2014
 Runner Up (2) : 2011, 2012

Angola Cup:
Winner (0): 
 Runner Up (1) : 2013

CAVB Club Champions Cup:
Winner (0):
 Runner Up (0) :

2015 squad (Women)

Managers

Past squads (Men)

Players

Men's 2014–2016
Primeiro de Agosto Men's Volleyball players 2011–2016 = Angola league winner

Women's 2011–2016
Primeiro de Agosto Women's Volleyball players 2011–2016 = Angola league winner; = African champions cup winner

See also
Primeiro de Agosto Football
Primeiro de Agosto Basketball
Primeiro de Agosto Handball
Primeiro de Agosto Roller Hockey

References

External links
 Men's squad in official website
 Women's squad in official website
 Facebook profile

C.D. Primeiro de Agosto
Sports clubs in Angola
Volleyball clubs in Angola